Caloptilia etiolata is a moth of the family Gracillariidae. It is known from Malaysia (Pahang).

References

etiolata
Moths of Asia
Moths described in 1993